Mariana Díaz Leal Arrillaga (born 29 May 1990) is a Mexican footballer who plays for Querétaro as a striker.

She previously played in the United Women's Soccer and the Italian Serie A for Houston Aces and San Zaccaria, respectively.

International career
Díaz Leal was called up by Mexico for training sessions in October 2015.

References

External links
Profile at La Liga 

1990 births
Living people
Sportspeople from Querétaro City
Mexican women's footballers
Footballers from Querétaro
Serie A (women's football) players
Primera División (women) players
Santa Teresa CD players
Mexican expatriate women's footballers
Mexican expatriate sportspeople in the United States
Expatriate women's soccer players in the United States
Mexican expatriate sportspeople in Italy
Expatriate women's footballers in Italy
Mexican expatriate sportspeople in Spain
Expatriate women's footballers in Spain
Women's association football forwards
Mexican footballers